Offred may refer to:

 Offred (The Handmaid's Tale novel character), the novel version of the character
 Offred (The Handmaid's Tale TV series character), the television version of the character
 "Offred" (The Handmaid's Tale episode)